The Beginner's Guide to Throwing Shapes is the eighth studio album by Saga, originally released in 1989.
It is also the second album recorded by the band without longtime drummer Steve Negus and keyboardist Jim Gilmour, who temporarily left the band over management concerns.

Track listing

Personnel

 Michael Sadler: Vocals & Keyboards
 Jim Crichton: Bass, Keyboards and Synthaxe
 Ian Crichton: Guitars, Synthaxe & Banjo
 Curt Cress: Drums and Percussion

Production
Produced by Saga
Jim Crichton – Recording Engineer
Brian Foraker – Mixing Engineer
Berthold Weindorf – Drum Recording Engineer
Drums Recorded in Pilot Studio, Munich
Album Recorded and Mixed at Picture This Studios
Album Cover Design and Photographs – Penny Crichton
Art Co-ordinator – Phillippe Grabowski

References

1989 albums
Saga (band) albums
SPV/Steamhammer albums